Attabotics is a Calgary-based robotics company which specializes in inventory management systems. Attabotics was named one of CNBC's 100 most promising startups in 2019, a special mention on Time Best Inventions of 2019, and Fast Company 32nd most innovative company in 2020.

Attabotics designs and produces a robotic inventory storage and retrieval system, which uses three dimensions of travel and is said to reduce warehouse footprint needed compared to a conventional fulfillment centre, and has a modular design allowing it to be easily scaled up or down.

Attabotics had a total of $32.7 million in funding by 2019; investors included Coatue Management, Comcast Ventures, Honeywell Ventures, Forerunner Ventures, and Werklund Growth Fund LP. It has also received government investment from Sustainable Development Technology Canada and the City of Calgary.

In 2019, Attabotics announced a new headquarters building in Northeast Calgary. The building, designed by Calgary-based Modern Office of Design + Architecture, is designed like a wedge to conform with nearby Calgary Airport height restrictions, and won a number of architectural awards in 2019.

References

Further reading

External links 
 

2016 establishments in Alberta
Companies based in Calgary
Technology companies of Canada
Canadian companies established in 2016
Technology companies established in 2016